The WHO Model List of Essential Medicines (aka Essential Medicines List or EML), published by the World Health Organization (WHO), contains the medications considered to be most effective and safe to meet the most important needs in a health system. The list is frequently used by countries to help develop their own local lists of essential medicines. , more than 155 countries have created national lists of essential medicines based on the World Health Organization's model list. This includes both developed and developing countries.

The list is divided into core items and complementary items. The core items are deemed to be the most cost-effective options for key health problems and are usable with little additional health care resources. The complementary items either require additional infrastructure such as specially trained health care providers or diagnostic equipment or have a lower cost–benefit ratio. About 25% of items are in the complementary list. Some medications are listed as both core and complementary. While most medications on the list are available as generic products, being under patent does not preclude inclusion.

The first list was published in 1977 and included 208 medications. The WHO updates the list every two years. There are 306 medications in the 14th list in 2005, 410 in the 19th list in 2015, 433 in the 20th list in 2017, 460 in the 21st list in 2019, and 479 in the 22nd list in 2021. Various national lists contain between 334 and 580 medications.

A separate list for children up to 12 years of age, known as the WHO Model List of Essential Medicines for Children (EMLc), was created in 2007 and is in its 8th edition. It was created to make sure that the needs of children were systematically considered such as availability of proper formulations. Everything in the children's list is also included in the main list. The list and notes are based on the 19th to 22nd edition of the main list. An α indicates a medicine is on the complementary list. Therapeutic alternatives with similar clinical performance are listed for some medicines and they may be considered for national essential medicines lists.

Anaesthetics, preoperative medicines and medical gases

General anaesthetics and oxygen

Inhalational medicines
 Halothane
 Isoflurane
 Nitrous oxide
 Oxygen

Injectable medicines
 Ketamine
 Propofol

Local anaesthetics
 Bupivacaine
 Lidocaine
 Lidocaine/epinephrine (lidocaine + epinephrine)

Complementary:
 Ephedrineα

Preoperative medication and sedation for short-term procedures
 Atropine
 Midazolam
 Morphine

Medical gases
 Oxygen

Medicines for pain and palliative care

Non-opioids and non-steroidal anti-inflammatory medicines (NSAIMs)

 Acetylsalicylic acid (aspirin)
 Ibuprofen
 Paracetamol (acetaminophen)

Opioid analgesics
 Codeine
 Fentanyl
 Morphine

Complementary:
 Methadoneα

Medicines for other common symptoms in palliative care
 Amitriptyline
 Cyclizine
 Dexamethasone
 Diazepam
 Docusate sodium
 Fluoxetine
 Haloperidol
 Hyoscine butylbromide
 Hyoscine hydrobromide
 Lactulose
 Loperamide
 Metoclopramide
 Midazolam
 Ondansetron
 Senna

Antiallergics and medicines used in anaphylaxis
 Dexamethasone
 Epinephrine (adrenaline)
 Hydrocortisone
 Loratadine
 Prednisolone

Antidotes and other substances used in poisonings

Non-specific
 Charcoal, activated

Specific
 Acetylcysteine
 Atropine
 Calcium gluconate
 Methylthioninium chloride (methylene blue)
 Naloxone
 Penicillamine
 Prussian blue
 Sodium nitrite
 Sodium thiosulfate

Complementary:
 Deferoxamineα
 Dimercaprolα
 Fomepizoleα
 Sodium calcium edetateα
 Succimerα

Anticonvulsants/antiepileptics
 Carbamazepine
 Diazepam
 Lamotrigine
 Lorazepam
 Magnesium sulfate
 Midazolam
 Phenobarbital
 Phenytoin
 Valproic acid (sodium valproate)

Complementary:
 Ethosuximideα
 Valproic acid (sodium valproate)α

Anti-infective medicines

Anthelminthics

Intestinal anthelminthics

 Albendazole
 Ivermectin
 Levamisole
 Mebendazole
 Niclosamide
 Praziquantel
 Pyrantel

Antifilarials
 Albendazole
 Diethylcarbamazine
 Ivermectin

Antischistosomals and other antinematode medicines
 Praziquantel
 Triclabendazole

Complementary:
 Oxamniquineα

Cysticidal medicines

Complementary:
 Albendazoleα
 Mebendazoleα
 Praziquantelα

Antibacterials

Access group antibiotics
 Amikacin
 Amoxicillin
 Amoxicillin/clavulanic acid (amoxicillin + clavulanic acid)
 Ampicillin
 Benzathine benzylpenicillin
 Benzylpenicillin
 Cefalexin
 Cefazolin
 Chloramphenicol
 Clindamycin
 Cloxacillin
 Doxycycline
 Gentamicin
 Metronidazole
 Nitrofurantoin
 Phenoxymethylpenicillin (penicillin V)
 Procaine benzylpenicillin
 Spectinomycin
 Sulfamethoxazole/trimethoprim (sulfamethoxazole + trimethoprim)
 Trimethoprim

Watch group antibiotics
 Azithromycin
 Cefixime
 Cefotaxime
 Ceftriaxone
 Cefuroxime
 Ciprofloxacin
 Clarithromycin
 Piperacillin/tazobactam (piperacillin + tazobactam)
 Vancomycin

Complementary:
 Ceftazidimeα
 Meropenemα
 Vancomycinα

Reserve group antibiotics
Reserve antibiotics are last-resort antibiotics. The EML antibiotic book was published in 2022.

Complementary:
 Cefiderocolα
 Ceftazidime/avibactam (ceftazidime + avibactam)α
 Colistinα
 Fosfomycinα
 Linezolidα
 Meropenem/vaborbactam (meropenem + vaborbactam)α
 Plazomicinα
 Polymyxin Bα

Antileprosy medicines
 Clofazimine
 Dapsone
 Rifampicin

Antituberculosis medicines

 Ethambutol
 Ethambutol/isoniazid/pyrazinamide/rifampicin (ethambutol + isoniazid + pyrazinamide + rifampicin)
 Ethambutol/isoniazid/rifampicin (ethambutol + isoniazid + rifampicin)
 Isoniazid
 Isoniazid/pyrazinamide/rifampicin (isoniazid + pyrazinamide + rifampicin)
 Isoniazid/rifampicin (isoniazid + rifampicin)
 Isoniazid/rifapentine (isoniazid + rifapentine)
 Moxifloxacin
 Pyrazinamide
 Rifabutin
 Rifampicin
 Rifapentine

Complementary:
 Amikacinα
 Amoxicillin/clavulanic acid (amoxicillin + clavulanic acid)α
 Bedaquilineα
 Clofazimineα
 Cycloserineα
 Delamanidα
 Ethionamideα
 Levofloxacinα
 Linezolidα
 Meropenemα
 Moxifloxacinα
 P-aminosalicylic acidα
 Streptomycinα

Antifungal medicines
 Amphotericin B
 Clotrimazole
 Fluconazole
 Flucytosine
 Griseofulvin
 Itraconazole
 Nystatin
 Voriconazole

Complementary:
 Micafunginα
 Potassium iodideα

Antiviral medicines

Antiherpes medicines
 Aciclovir

Antiretrovirals

Nucleoside/nucleotide reverse transcriptase inhibitors
 Abacavir
 Lamivudine
 Tenofovir disoproxil fumarate
 Zidovudine

Non-nucleoside reverse transcriptase inhibitors
 Efavirenz
 Nevirapine

Protease inhibitors

 Atazanavir/ritonavir (atazanavir + ritonavir)
 Darunavir
 Lopinavir/ritonavir (lopinavir + ritonavir)
 Ritonavir

Integrase inhibitors
 Dolutegravir
 Raltegravir

Fixed-dose combinations of antiretroviral medicines
 Abacavir/lamivudine (abacavir + lamivudine)
 Dolutegravir/lamivudine/tenofovir (dolutegravir + lamivudine + tenofovir)
 Efavirenz/emtricitabine/tenofovir
 Efavirenz/lamivudine/tenofovir (efavirenz + lamivudine + tenofovir)
 Emtricitabine/tenofovir (emtricitabine + tenofovir)
 Lamivudine/zidovudine (lamivudine + zidovudine)

Medicines for prevention of HIV-related opportunistic infections
 Isoniazid/pyridoxine/sulfamethoxazole/trimethoprim (isoniazid + pyridoxine + sulfamethoxazole + trimethoprim)

Other antivirals
 Ribavirin
 Valganciclovir

Complementary:
 Oseltamivirα
 Valganciclovirα

Antihepatitis medicines

Medicines for hepatitis B

Nucleoside/Nucleotide reverse transcriptase inhibitors
 Entecavir
 Tenofovir disoproxil fumarate

Medicines for hepatitis C

Pangenotypic direct-acting antiviral combinations
 Daclatasvir
 Daclatasvir/sofosbuvir (daclatasvir + sofosbuvir)
 Glecaprevir/pibrentasvir (glecaprevir + pibrentasvir)
 Sofosbuvir
 Sofosbuvir/velpatasvir (sofosbuvir + velpatasvir)

Non-pangenotypic direct-acting antiviral combinations
 Dasabuvir
 Ledipasvir/sofosbuvir (ledipasvir + sofosbuvir)
 Ombitasvir/paritaprevir/ritonavir (ombitasvir + paritaprevir + ritonavir)

Other antivirals for hepatitis C
 Ribavirin

Complementary:
 Pegylated interferon-alpha-2a or pegylated interferon-alpha-2bα

Antiprotozoal medicines

Antiamoebic and antigiardiasis medicines
 Diloxanide
 Metronidazole

Antileishmaniasis medicines
 Amphotericin B
 Miltefosine
 Paromomycin
 Sodium stibogluconate or meglumine antimoniate

Antimalarial medicines

For curative treatment
 Amodiaquine
 Artemether
 Artemether/lumefantrine (artemether + lumefantrine)
 Artesunate
 Artesunate/amodiaquine (artesunate + amodiaquine)
 Artesunate/mefloquine (artesunate + mefloquine)
 Artesunate/pyronaridine tetraphosphate (artesunate + pyronaridine tetraphosphate)
 Chloroquine
 Dihydroartemisinin/piperaquine phosphate (dihydroartemisinin + piperaquine phosphate)
 Doxycycline
 Mefloquine
 Primaquine
 Quinine
 Sulfadoxine/pyrimethamine (sulfadoxine + pyrimethamine)

For chemoprevention
 Amodiaquine + sulfadoxine/pyrimethamine (Co-packaged)
 Chloroquine
 Doxycycline
 Mefloquine
 Proguanil
 Sulfadoxine/pyrimethamine (sulfadoxine + pyrimethamine)

Antipneumocystosis and antitoxoplasmosis medicines
 Pyrimethamine
 Sulfadiazine
 Sulfamethoxazole/trimethoprim (sulfamethoxazole + trimethoprim)

Complementary:
 Pentamidineα

Antitrypanosomal medicines

African trypanosomiasis
 Fexinidazole

Medicines for the treatment of 1st stage African trypanosomiasis
 Pentamidine
 Suramin sodium

Medicines for the treatment of 2nd stage African trypanosomiasis
 Eflornithine
 Melarsoprol
 Nifurtimox

Complementary:
 Melarsoprolα

American trypanosomiasis
 Benznidazole
 Nifurtimox

Medicines for ectoparasitic infections
 Ivermectin

Antimigraine medicines

For treatment of acute attack
 Acetylsalicylic acid (aspirin)
 Ibuprofen
 Paracetamol (acetaminophen)
 Sumatriptan

For prophylaxis
 Propranolol

Immunomodulators and antineoplastics

Immunomodulators for non-malignant disease

Complementary:
 Adalimumabα
 Azathioprineα
 Ciclosporinα
 Tacrolimusα

Antineoplastics and supportive medicines

Cytotoxic medicines

Complementary:
 Arsenic trioxideα
 Asparaginaseα
 Bendamustineα
 Bleomycinα
 Calcium folinateα
 Capecitabineα
 Carboplatinα
 Chlorambucilα
 Cisplatinα
 Cyclophosphamideα
 Cytarabineα
 Dacarbazineα
 Dactinomycinα
 Daunorubicinα
 Docetaxelα
 Doxorubicinα
 Etoposideα
 Fludarabineα
 Fluorouracilα
 Gemcitabineα
 Hydroxycarbamideα
 Ifosfamideα
 Irinotecanα
 Melphalanα
 Mercaptopurineα
 Methotrexateα
 Oxaliplatinα
 Paclitaxelα
 Pegaspargaseα
 Procarbazineα
 Realgar Indigo naturalis formulationα
 Tioguanineα
 Vinblastineα
 Vincristineα
 Vinorelbineα

Targeted therapies

Complementary:
 All-trans retinoic acid (tretinoin) (ATRA)α
 Bortezomibα
 Dasatinibα
 Erlotinibα
 Everolimusα
 Ibrutinibα
 Imatinibα
 Nilotinibα
 Rituximabα
 Trastuzumabα

Immunomodulators

Complementary:
 Filgrastimα
 Lenalidomideα
 Nivolumabα
 Thalidomideα

Hormones and antihormones

Complementary:
 Abirateroneα
 Anastrozoleα
 Bicalutamideα
 Dexamethasoneα
 Hydrocortisoneα
 Leuprorelinα
 Methylprednisoloneα
 Prednisoloneα
 Tamoxifenα

Supportive medicines

Complementary:
 Allopurinolα
 Mesnaα
 Rasburicaseα
 Zoledronic acidα

Antiparkinsonism medicines
 Biperiden
 Levodopa/carbidopa (levodopa + carbidopa)

Medicines affecting the blood

Antianaemia medicines
 Ferrous salt
 Ferrous salt/folic acid (ferrous salt + folic acid)
 Folic acid
 Hydroxocobalamin

Complementary:
 Erythropoiesis-stimulating agentsα

Medicines affecting coagulation
 Dabigatran
 Enoxaparin
 Heparin sodium
 Phytomenadione
 Protamine sulfate
 Tranexamic acid
 Warfarin

Complementary:
 Desmopressinα
 Heparin sodiumα
 Protamine sulfateα
 Warfarinα

Other medicines for haemoglobinopathies

Complementary:
 Deferoxamineα
 Hydroxycarbamideα

Blood products of human origin and plasma substitutes

Blood and blood components

 Fresh frozen plasma
 Platelets
 Red blood cells
 Whole blood

Plasma-derived medicines

Human immunoglobulins
 Rho(D) immune globulin (anti-D immunoglobulin)
 Anti-rabies immunoglobulin
 Anti-tetanus immunoglobulin

Complementary:
 Normal immunoglobulinα

Blood coagulation factors

Complementary:
 Coagulation factor VIIIα
 Coagulation factor IXα

Plasma substitutes
 Dextran 70

Cardiovascular medicines

Antianginal medicines
 Bisoprolol
 Glyceryl trinitrate
 Isosorbide dinitrate
 Verapamil

Antiarrhythmic medicines
 Bisoprolol
 Digoxin
 Epinephrine (adrenaline)
 Lidocaine
 Verapamil

Complementary:
 Amiodaroneα

Antihypertensive medicines
 Amlodipine
 Bisoprolol
 Enalapril
 Hydralazine
 Hydrochlorothiazide
 Lisinopril/amlodipine (lisinopril + amlodipine)
 Lisinopril/hydrochlorothiazide (lisinopril + hydrochlorothiazide)
 Losartan
 Methyldopa
 Telmisartan/amlodipine (telmisartan + amlodipine)
 Telmisartan/hydrochlorothiazide (telmisartan + hydrochlorothiazide)

Complementary:
 Sodium nitroprussideα

Medicines used in heart failure
 Bisoprolol
 Digoxin
 Enalapril
 Furosemide
 Hydrochlorothiazide
 Losartan
 Spironolactone

Complementary:
 Dopamineα

Antithrombotic medicines

Anti-platelet medicines
 Acetylsalicylic acid (aspirin)
 Clopidogrel

Thrombolytic medicines

Complementary:
 Alteplaseα
 Streptokinaseα

Lipid-lowering agents
 Simvastatin

Dermatological medicines (topical)

Antifungal medicines
 Miconazole
 Selenium sulfide
 Sodium thiosulfate
 Terbinafine

Anti-infective medicines
 Mupirocin
 Potassium permanganate
 Silver sulfadiazine

Anti-inflammatory and antipruritic medicines
 Betamethasone
 Calamine
 Hydrocortisone

Medicines affecting skin differentiation and proliferation
 Benzoyl peroxide
 Calcipotriol
 Coal tar
 Fluorouracil
 Podophyllum resin
 Salicylic acid
 Urea

Scabicides and pediculicides
 Benzyl benzoate
 Permethrin

Diagnostic agents

Ophthalmic medicines
 Fluorescein
 Tropicamide

Radiocontrast media
 Amidotrizoate
 Barium sulfate
 Iohexol

Complementary:
 Barium sulfateα
 Meglumine iotroxateα

Antiseptics and disinfectants

Antiseptics
 Chlorhexidine
 Ethanol
 Povidone iodine

Disinfectants
 Alcohol based hand rub
 Chlorine base compound
 Chloroxylenol
 Glutaral

Diuretics
 Amiloride
 Furosemide
 Hydrochlorothiazide
 Mannitol
 Spironolactone

Complementary:
 Hydrochlorothiazideα
 Mannitolα
 Spironolactoneα

Gastrointestinal medicines

Complementary:
 Pancreatic enzymesα

Antiulcer medicines
 Omeprazole
 Ranitidine

Antiemetic medicines
 Dexamethasone
 Metoclopramide
 Ondansetron

Complementary:
 Aprepitantα

Anti-inflammatory medicines
 Sulfasalazine

Complementary:
 Hydrocortisoneα
 Prednisoloneα

Laxatives
 Senna

Medicines used in diarrhoea
 Oral rehydration salts + zinc sulfate (Co-packaged)

Oral rehydration
 Oral rehydration salts

Medicines for diarrhea
 Zinc sulfate

Medicines for endocrine disorders

Adrenal hormones and synthetic substitutes
 Fludrocortisone
 Hydrocortisone

Androgens

Complementary:
 Testosteroneα

Estrogens
No listings in this section.

Progestogens
 Medroxyprogesterone acetate

Medicines for diabetes

Insulins
 Insulin injection (soluble)
 Intermediate-acting insulin
 Long-acting insulin analogues

Oral hypoglycaemic agents
 Empagliflozin
 Gliclazide
 Metformin

Complementary:
 Metforminα

Medicines for hypoglycaemia
 Glucagon

Complementary:
 Diazoxideα

Thyroid hormones and antithyroid medicines
 Levothyroxine
 Potassium iodide
 Methimazole
 Propylthiouracil

Complementary:
 Lugol's solutionα
 Methimazoleα
 Potassium iodideα
 Propylthiouracilα

Immunologicals

Diagnostic agents
 Tuberculin, purified protein derivative (PPD)

Sera, immunoglobulins and monoclonal antibodies
 Anti-rabies virus monoclonal antibodies
 Antivenom immunoglobulin
 Diphtheria antitoxin
 Equine rabies immunoglobulin

Vaccines

Recommendations for all
 BCG vaccine
 Diphtheria vaccine
 Haemophilus influenzae type b vaccine
 Hepatitis B vaccine
 Human papilloma virus (HPV) vaccine
 Measles vaccine
 Pertussis vaccine
 Pneumococcal vaccine
 Poliomyelitis vaccine
 Rotavirus vaccine
 Rubella vaccine
 Tetanus vaccine

Recommendations for certain regions
 Japanese encephalitis vaccine
 Tick-borne encephalitis vaccine
 Yellow fever vaccine

Recommendations for some high-risk populations
 Cholera vaccine
 Dengue vaccine
 Hepatitis A vaccine
 Meningococcal meningitis vaccine
 Rabies vaccine
 Typhoid vaccine

Recommendations for immunization programmes with certain characteristics
 Influenza vaccine (seasonal)
 Mumps vaccine
 Varicella vaccine

Muscle relaxants (peripherally-acting) and cholinesterase inhibitors
 Atracurium
 Neostigmine
 Suxamethonium
 Vecuronium

Complementary:
 Pyridostigmineα
 Vecuroniumα

Ophthalmological preparations

Anti-infective agents
 Aciclovir
 Azithromycin
 Erythromycin
 Gentamicin
 Natamycin
 Ofloxacin
 Tetracycline

Anti-inflammatory agents
 Prednisolone

Local anesthetics
 Tetracaine

Miotics and antiglaucoma medicines
 Acetazolamide
 Latanoprost
 Pilocarpine
 Timolol

Mydriatics
 Atropine

Complementary:
 Epinephrine (adrenaline)α

Anti-vascular endothelial growth factor (VEGF)

Complementary:
 Bevacizumabα

Medicines for reproductive health and perinatal care

Contraceptives

Oral hormonal contraceptives
 Ethinylestradiol/levonorgestrel (ethinylestradiol + levonorgestrel)
 Ethinylestradiol/norethisterone (ethinylestradiol + norethisterone)
 Levonorgestrel
 Ulipristal

Injectable hormonal contraceptives
 Estradiol cypionate/medroxyprogesterone acetate (estradiol cypionate + medroxyprogesterone acetate)
 Medroxyprogesterone acetate
 Norethisterone enantate

Intrauterine devices
 IUD with copper
 IUD with progestogen

Barrier methods
 Condoms
 Diaphragms

Implantable contraceptives
 Etonogestrel-releasing implant
 Levonorgestrel-releasing implant

Intravaginal contraceptives
 Ethinylestradiol/etonogestrel (ethinylestradiol + etonogestrel)
 Progesterone vaginal ring

Ovulation inducers

Complementary:
 Clomifeneα

Uterotonics
 Carbetocin
 Ergometrine
 Mifepristone + misoprostol (Co-packaged)
 Misoprostol
 Oxytocin

Antioxytocics (tocolytics)
 Nifedipine

Medicines administered to the mother
 Dexamethasone
 Multiple micronutrient supplement
 Tranexamic acid

Medicines administered to the neonate
 Caffeine citrate
 Chlorhexidine

Complementary:
 Ibuprofenα
 Prostaglandin E1α
 Surfactantα

Peritoneal dialysis solution

Complementary:
 Intraperitoneal dialysis solution (of appropriate composition)α

Medicines for mental and behavioural disorders

Medicines used in psychotic disorders
 Chlorpromazine
 Fluphenazine
 Haloperidol
 Paliperidone
 Risperidone

Complementary:
 Chlorpromazineα
 Clozapineα
 Haloperidolα

Medicines used in mood disorders

Medicines used in depressive disorders
 Amitriptyline
 Fluoxetine

Complementary:
 Fluoxetineα
 Sertraline

Medicines used in bipolar disorders
 Carbamazepine
 Lithium carbonate
 Valproic acid (sodium valproate)

Medicines for anxiety disorders
 Diazepam

Medicines used for obsessive compulsive disorders
 Clomipramine

Medicines for disorders due to psychoactive substance use
 Bupropion
 Nicotine replacement therapy
 Varenicline

Complementary:
 Methadoneα

Medicines acting on the respiratory tract

Antiasthmatics and medicines for chronic obstructive pulmonary disease
 Budesonide
 Budesonide/formoterol (budesonide + formoterol)
 Epinephrine (adrenaline)
 Ipratropium bromide
 Salbutamol
 Tiotropium

Solutions correcting water, electrolyte and acid-base disturbances

Oral
 Oral rehydration salts
 Potassium chloride

Parenteral
 Glucose
 Glucose with sodium chloride
 Potassium chloride
 Sodium chloride
 Sodium hydrogen carbonate
 Sodium lactate, compound solution (Ringer's lactate solution)

Miscellaneous
 Water for injection

Vitamins and minerals
 Ascorbic acid
 Calcium
 Colecalciferol
 Ergocalciferol
 Iodine
 Multiple micronutrient powder
 Nicotinamide
 Pyridoxine
 Retinol
 Riboflavin
 Thiamine

Complementary:
 Calcium gluconateα

Ear, nose and throat medicines
 Acetic acid
 Budesonide
 Ciprofloxacin
 Xylometazoline

Medicines for diseases of joints

Medicines used to treat gout
 Allopurinol

Disease-modifying agents used in rheumatoid disorders (DMARDs)
 Chloroquine

Complementary:
 Azathioprineα
 Hydroxychloroquineα
 Methotrexateα
 Penicillamineα
 Sulfasalazineα

Juvenile joint diseases
 Acetylsalicylic acid (aspirin)

Dental preparations
 Fluoride
 Glass ionomer cement
 Silver diamine fluoride

Notes
An α indicates the medicine is on the complementary list for which specialized diagnostic or monitoring or training is needed. An item may also be listed as complementary on the basis of higher costs or a less attractive cost-benefit ratio.

References

Further reading

External links 

 
Drug-related lists
Publications established in 1977
Wikipedia medicine articles ready to translate